Programmed cell death 1 ligand 2 (also known as PD-L2, B7-DC) is a protein that in humans is encoded by the PDCD1LG2 gene. PDCD1LG2 has also been designated as CD273 (cluster of differentiation 273). PDCD1LG2 is an immune checkpoint receptor ligand which plays a role in negative regulation of the adaptive immune response. PD-L2 is one of two known ligands for Programmed cell death protein 1 (PD-1).

Structure 

PD-L2 is a cell surface receptor belonging to the B7 protein family. It consists of both an immunoglobulin-like variable domain and an immunoglobulin-like constant domain in the extracellular region, a transmembrane domain, and a cytoplasmic domain. PD-L2 shares considerable sequence homology with other B7 proteins, but it does not contain the putative binding sequence for CD28/CTLA4, namely SQDXXXELY or XXXYXXRT.

The crystal structure of murine PD-L2 bound to murine PD-1 has been determined. as well as the structure of the hPD-L2/mutant hPD-1 complex.

Expression

Profile 
PD-L2 is primarily expressed on professional antigen presenting cells including dendritic cells (DCs) and macrophages. Others have shown PD-L2 expression in certain T helper cell subsets and cytotoxic T cells. PD-L2 protein is widely expressed in many healthy tissues including the GI tract tissues, skeletal muscles, tonsils, and pancreas. Additionally, PD-L2 has moderate to high expression in triple-negative breast cancer and gastric cancer and low expression in renal cell carcinoma. PD-L2 mRNA is widely expressed and not enriched in any particular tissue.

Regulation 
Interleukin-4 (IL-4) and granulocyte-macrophage colony stimulating factor (GMCSF) both upregulate PD-L2 expression in DCs in vitro. IFN-α, IFN-β, and IFN-γ induce moderate upregulation of PD-L2 expression.

Function 
PD-L2 binds to its receptor PD-1 with dissociation constant Kd of 11.3 nM. Binding to PD-1 can activate pathways inhibiting TCR/BCR-mediated immune cell activation (for a more detailed discussion see PD-1 signaling). PD-L2 plays an important role in immune tolerance and autoimmunity. Both PD-L1 and PD-L2 can inhibit T cell proliferation and inflammatory cytokine production. Blocking PD-L2 has been shown to exacerbate experimental autoimmune encephalomyelitis. Unlike PD-L1, PD-L2 has been shown activate the immune system. PD-L2 triggers IL-12 production in murine dendritic cells leading to T cell activation. Others have shown that treatment with PD-L2 Ig led to T helper cell proliferation.

Clinical significance 
PD-L2, PD-L1, and PD-1 expressions are important in the immune response to certain cancers. Due to their role in suppressing the adaptive immune system, efforts have been made to block PD-1 and PD-L1, resulting in FDA approved inhibitors for both (see pembrolizumab, nivolumab, atezolizumab). There are still no FDA approved inhibitors for PD-L2 as of 2019.

The direct role of PD-L2 in cancer progression and immune-tumor microenvironment regulation is not as well studied as the role of PD-L1. In mouse cell cultures, PD-L2 expression on tumor cells suppressed cytotoxic T cell-mediated immune responses.

Indirectly, PD-L2 may have utility as a biomarker or prognostic indicator. PD-L2 expression has been shown to predict response to PD-1 blockade with pembrolizumab independently of PD-L1 expression. However, PD-L2 does not putatively predict outcome in cancer, with some studies suggesting it predicts negative prognoses and other studies suggesting it predicts positive prognoses.

References

Further reading

External links 
 

Clusters of differentiation